Thomas Biagi (born 7 May 1976, in Bologna), is an Italian professional racing driver.

Biagi started his career in single seaters, driving in Formula Alfa Boxer and Italian Formula Three Championship, where he was 5th best in 1995, with two wins. From there, he moved up to the FIA Formula 3000 Championship from 1995 to 1998, without major results.  His debut race in 1995 saw him collide with Marco Campos on the last lap, resulting in a crash which inflicted fatal injuries leading his the death of Campos.

Biagi switched to the "second division", the Italian F3000 Championship, in 1999, taking 4th place, which he repeated in 2000 (after the series had become Euro F3000), this time with a win, before taking a 2nd overall in 2001, in his second season with GP Racing.

In 2003, Thomas Biagi made a successful move to the FIA GT Championship, which he won in a BMS Scuderia Italia Ferrari 550 Maranello (co-driven with Matteo Bobbi). After a year in the Le Mans Endurance Series, he returned to the FIA GT with Vitaphone Racing, helping the squad take two Team titles before winning the Drivers title himself in 2007.

In spite of having won the drivers title in the GT1 class, Biagi downgraded to GT2 in 2008, to drive a Ferrari 430 for AF Corse.

Racing record

Complete International Formula 3000 results
(key) (Races in bold indicate pole position; races in italics indicate fastest lap.)

24 Hours of Le Mans results

24 Hours of Daytona
(key)

Complete International Superstars Series results
(key) (Races in bold indicate pole position) (Races in italics indicate fastest lap)

Complete Porsche Supercup results
(key) (Races in bold indicate pole position) (Races in italics indicate fastest lap)

 Did not finish, but was classified as he had completed more than 90% of the race distance.

Sources

External links
 
 

1976 births
Living people
Sportspeople from Bologna
Italian racing drivers
Italian Formula Three Championship drivers
Auto GP drivers
FIA GT Championship drivers
24 Hours of Le Mans drivers
International Formula 3000 drivers
Speedcar Series drivers
European Le Mans Series drivers
Superstars Series drivers
Blancpain Endurance Series drivers
24 Hours of Spa drivers
Porsche Supercup drivers
International GT Open drivers
BVM Racing drivers
Scuderia Coloni drivers
Prema Powerteam drivers
AF Corse drivers
BMW M drivers
Piquet GP drivers
Team Lazarus drivers
RC Motorsport drivers
Nordic Racing drivers